Karin Huttary (born 23 May 1977 in Innsbruck) is an Austrian freestyle skier who won a silver medal at the FIS Freestyle World Ski Championships 2009 in ski-cross. Although an Austrian she was once a member of the Swedish ski team, but switched to ski-cross and will compete for Austria at the 2010 Winter Olympics.

References

External links 
 Website of Karin Huttary

1977 births
Living people
Sportspeople from Innsbruck
Austrian female freestyle skiers
Freestyle skiers at the 2010 Winter Olympics
Olympic freestyle skiers of Austria
Swedish female alpine skiers
Universiade medalists in freestyle skiing
Universiade gold medalists for Austria
Competitors at the 2005 Winter Universiade
21st-century Austrian women